Abraham J. Berry (c. 1797–1865), a physician, was the first mayor of "the independent city of Williamsburgh."

Early life
Berry "was born in New York City and educated as a physician." "Dr. Berry became one of the most admired and recognized figures in the city" partly due to his 1832 work with cholera patients.

First mayor of Williamsburgh
Among his accomplishments leading up to and becoming the first mayor of Williamsburgh (1852–1853) were:
 a ferry linking to Manhattan
 dropping the h from Williamsburgh
 "his 1855 proposal consolidated Williamsburg with the rest of Brooklyn."

Following his term in office, Berry was unsuccessful in a four-way race for a congressional seat. In 1851, prior to his mayoral term in office, he was an election supervisor, appointing election inspectors. Only one other person served after him as mayor of Williamburgh.

Civil War
"At the beginning of the Civil War, Dr. Berry enlisted as a surgeon in the 38th New York Infantry."
 He died "the result of a fever he contracted during that time."

Family
He had a wife,  a daughter named Julia (d. 1906), and a son John (c. 1835–1915).

Legacy
The name Berry in Williamsburg's Berry Playground at 106 South Third Street, between Bedford Avenue and Berry Street, refers to:
 nearby Berry Street
 the street was named for his family
 that he was a physician, and the park's address is linked to a since-closed hospital.

References

1790s births
1865 deaths
19th-century American physicians
People from Brooklyn
Union Army surgeons